Simone Borgheresi (born 1 August 1968 in Greve in Chianti) is a former Italian racing cyclist.

Major results

1995
1st stage 4 Vuelta a Aragón
8th Tirreno–Adriatico
1997
3rd Trofeo Pantalica
2nd Trofeo dello Scalatore
1998
1st Subida a Urkiola
1999
1st Giro dell'Appennino
2000
1st Giro del Trentino
1st stage 1

References

1968 births
Living people
People from Greve in Chianti
Italian male cyclists
Sportspeople from the Metropolitan City of Florence
Cyclists from Tuscany